'Anaza or anaza (sometimes also transliterated as 'anza or anza) is a term for a short spear or staff which gained ritual significance in the early years of Islam after the Islamic prophet Muhammad planted his spear in the ground to mark the direction of prayer (qibla). It became an architectural term to designate an outdoor mihrab in a mosque, mainly in the Maghreb.

Origins 
The 'anaza was the spear (also known as a ḥarba) of Muhammad and first appears as part of Muslim ritual in the year 624 CE (2 AH), when Muhammad celebrated the first Eid al-Fitr. When Muhammad and the other Muslims reached the musalla (outdoor prayer space), he planted the spear in the ground and used it to indicate the direction of prayers (the qibla), much like a mihrab would in later mosques. The spear was used in this way again on Eid al-Adha the same year. The early caliphs expanded on this practice, making it customary to carry a staff, sword, or bow on ceremonial occasions when ascending the pulpit (minbar), symbolizing authority. The image of the anaza planted in front of a mihrab arch also appears on some early Umayyad coinage.

Architectural feature 
Perhaps related to this symbolic use as an early qibla indicator, the term "anaza" later came to be applied in to an architectural feature of many mosques in the western Maghreb and Morocco. It was used to designate an "outdoor" or "summer" mihrab, usually an ornate wooden screen that stood at the border between the sahn (courtyard) of a mosque and its interior prayer hall and which was aligned with the mosque's central mihrab axis. This anaza could thus serve as a mihrab for prayers held outside in the courtyard. The wooden screen was often carved and painted with a stylized mihrab motif and other inscriptions. The anaza could also be a simple mark on the pavement or floor of the courtyard in front of the prayer hall's central entrance; e.g. a semi-circular groove or recess in the middle of the step leading to the entrance. 

Wooden anazas were constructed in mosques across Morocco and the Maghreb. In Morocco they became a standard feature of "grand mosques" or Friday mosques in particular. The oldest surviving example is the anaza of the al-Andalusiyyin Mosque in Fez, which dates from 1209 (from the Almohad period). Historical sources also mention an even older anaza, dating from 1129 (during the Almoravid period), at the Qarawiyyin Mosque in Fez, but it no longer exists today and has been replaced by the current Marinid-era anaza which was fabricated between 1288 and 1290. The anaza in the Grand Mosque of Fes el-Jdid, which likely dates from the mosque's construction in 1276, is very similar and might be the oldest Marinid anaza. A similar example is also found in the Grand Mosque of Meknes but was built much later in 1715 (during the reign of the Alaouite sultan Moulay Ismail). Some other post-Marinid examples also include the anaza of the 16th-century Mouassine Mosque in Marrakesh (from the Saadian period). The anaza of the near-contemporary Bab Doukkala Mosque in Marrakesh, on the other hand, is a modern replacement of the original one.

References 

Architecture in Morocco
Islamic architectural elements
Islamic terminology
Mosque architecture